Pulo may refer to:

Places
 Pulo, Cabuyao, a village in the Philippines
 Pulo do Lobo, a waterfall in Portugal
 Pulo Gadung, a subdistrict in Jakarta, Indonesia
 Pulo Jehat, an island in Malaysia
 Duri Pulo, Gambir, a village in Indonesia
 Isla Pulo, an island in Metro Manila, Philippines

Dolines 
 Pulo di Altamura, a karst doline located in Altamura, Italy
 Pulo di Molfetta, a karst doline located in Molfetta, Italy
 Pulicchio di Gravina, a karst doline located in Gravina in Puglia, Italy
 Pulicchio di Toritto, a karst doline located in Toritto, Italy

Others
 Patani United Liberation Organisation, Thailand

See also
 Polo (disambiguation)